Amorphophallus (from Ancient Greek , "without form, misshapen" + phallos, "penis", referring to the shape of the prominent spadix) is a large genus of some 200 tropical and subtropical tuberous herbaceous plants from the Arum family (Araceae), native to Asia, Africa, Australia and various oceanic islands. A few species are edible as "famine foods" after careful preparation to remove irritating chemicals. The genus includes the Titan arum (A. titanum) of Indonesia, which has the largest inflorescence of any plant in the genus, and is also known as the 'corpse flower' for the pungent odour it produces during its flowering period, which can take up through seven years of growth before it occurs.

History 
The oldest systematic record of the plants was in 1692, when Van Rheede tot Drakenstein published descriptions of two plants. The name "Amorphophallus" was first mentioned in 1834 by the Dutch botanist Blume.
Between 1876 and 1911, Engler merged a number of other genera into Amorphophallus, with a final monograph published in 1911.

Distribution 
These are typical lowland plants, growing in the tropical and subtropical zones of the paleotropics, from West Africa through the Pacific Islands. None of them are found in the Americas, although a remarkably similar but not closely related genus, Dracontium, has evolved there. Most species are endemic. They grow preferentially on disturbed grounds, such as secondary forests.

Description 

These small to massive plants grow from a subterranean tuber. Amorphophallus tubers vary greatly from species to species, from the quite uniformly globose tuber of A. konjac to the elongated tubers of A. longituberosus and A. macrorhizus to the bizarre clustered rootstock of A. coaetaneus. The weight of these tubers range from as little as ten grams (3/10ths of an ounce) in Amorphophallus pusillus of Vietnam to as much as 305 pounds (139 kg) for Amorphophallus titanum, a 14,000 fold difference in weight. From the top of this tuber a single leaf, which can be several meters across in larger species, is produced atop a trunk-like petiole followed, on maturity, by a single inflorescence. This leaf consists of a vertical leaf stalk and a horizontal blade, which may consist of a number of small leaflets. The leaf lasts one growing season. The peduncle (the primary flower stalk) can be long or short.

As is typical of the Arum family, these species develop an inflorescence consisting of an elongate or ovate spathe (a sheathing bract) which usually envelops the spadix (a flower spike with a fleshy axis). The spathe can have different colors, but mostly brownish-purple or whitish-green. On the inside, they contain ridges or warts, functioning as insect traps.

The plants are monoecious. The spadix has tiny flowers: female flowers, no more than a pistil,  at the bottom, then male flowers, each with one stamen, and then a blank sterile area. This last part, called 'the appendix', consists of sterile flowers, called staminodes, and can be especially large. The flowers do not have corollas.

Mature female flowers are usually receptive for only 1 day.  In many species, the inflorescence emits a scent of decaying flesh in order to  attract insects, though a number of species give off a pleasant odor. Through a number of ingenious insect traps, pollinating insects that entered a spathe when female flowers were receptive remain inside the spathe for about 1 day while male flowers mature and release pollen. Pollen falls on these insects, and they carry pollen as they exit the spathe and can pollinate female flowers in another spathe. Amorphophallus species are used as food plants by the larvae of some Lepidoptera (butterfly and moth) species including Palpifer sexnotatus and Palpifer sordida.

Pollinated flowers usually each develop into a globose berry, a fruit. The berries are red, orange-red, white, white and yellow, or blue, depending on the species.

Notable species 
The floriculturalist described it as smelling "like roadkill, a barnyard, a dirty diaper, very strong, a little bit of mothball smell too". Native to the Indonesian rainforest, it takes about 10 years to blossom. Dubbed "Alice", its bloom was broadcast via live webcam. It is one of two plants at the Chicago Botanic Gardens, which kept open until 2 am on September 30 to accommodate visitors.

A runner-up is Amorphophallus gigas, which is taller, but has a somewhat smaller inflorescence. 

Amorphophallus konjac tubers are used to make , a Japanese thickening agent and edible jelly containing glucomannan.

Some species are called voodoo-lily, as are some species of Typhonium (also in the Araceae).

Taxonomy and Systematics 
The genus was divided into 4 subgenera based on phylogenetic analysis in 2017, with a number of SE Asian genera currently unplaced:

Subgenus Amorphophallus

Subgenus Scutrandrium

Subgenus Metandrium

Subgenus Afrophallus

Subgenus unplaced
 Amorphophallus forbesii (Engl.) Engl. & Gehrm. - Sumatra
 Amorphophallus gliruroides Engl. - Myanmar
 Amorphophallus gracilis Engl. - Sumatra
 Amorphophallus incurvatus Alderw. - Sumatra
 Amorphophallus lyratus (Roxb.) Kunth - SE India
 Amorphophallus mekongensis Engl. & Gehrm. - Indochina
 Amorphophallus minor Ridl. - Peninsula Malaysia
 Amorphophallus obovoideus Alderw. - Sumatra
 Amorphophallus paucisectus Alderw. - Sumatra
 Amorphophallus perakensis Engl. - Peninsula Malaysia
 Amorphophallus purpurascens Kurz ex Hook.f. - Myanmar

References 

 Hetterscheid, W.L.A. 1994. Preliminary taxonomy and morphology of Amorphophallus Blume ex Decaisne (Araceae). In: M.M. Serebreyanyi (ed.), Proc. Moscow Aroid Conference 1992: 35-48. Moscow.
 Hetterscheid, W.L.A. & G.J.C.M. v. Vliet, 1996. Amorphophallus, giant from the forest. CITES/C&M, 2(4): 86-96.

External links 

 List of Amorphophallus species with photos from the International Aroid Society
 CATE genus page
 Amorphophallus in Brunken, U., Schmidt, M., Dressler, S., Janssen, T., Thiombiano, A. & Zizka, G. 2008. West African plants - A Photo Guide. Forschungsinstitut Senckenberg, Frankfurt/Main.

 
Araceae genera
Taxa named by Joseph Decaisne